The following highways are numbered 943:

United States